Mary Dibley (21 February 1883 in London – 11 September 1968) was a British film actress. She was married to the actor Gerald Ames.

Selected filmography
 The Christian (1915)
 The Shulamite (1915)
 The Folly of Desire (1915)
 Sally in Our Alley (1916)
 Red Pottage (1918)
 The Romance of Old Bill (1918)
 The Admirable Crichton (1918)
 The Garden of Resurrection (1919)
 Sheba (1919)
 The Nature of the Beast (1919)
 The Amazing Quest of Mr. Ernest Bliss (1920)
 The Lure of Crooning Water (1920)
 The Autumn of Pride (1921)
 Mary Find the Gold (1921)
 The Bargain (1921)
 The Shadow of Evil (1921)
 The Card (1922)
 Simple Simon (1922)
 A Royal Divorce (1923)
 Strangling Threads (1923)
 The Unwanted (1924)
The Blue Peter (1928)
 A South Sea Bubble (1928)
 His House in Order (1928)
 The Hellcat (1928)

References

External links

1883 births
1968 deaths
Actresses from London
English film actresses
English silent film actresses
20th-century English actresses